Brian Wardle may refer to:

Brian Wardle (academic) (born 1969), professor of aeronautics and astronautics
Brian Wardle (basketball) (born 1979), American college basketball coach